The Grand Forks Railway  is a shortline railway company operating in the West Kootenay region of southeastern British Columbia.

Former operators
In Grand Forks, a former north–south section of the Kettle Valley Lines (KVL) (the operating company for the Kettle River Valley Railway (KRVR) and the Spokane and British Columbia Railway) both crossed and connected with the Canadian Pacific Railway (CP) line near the north end of today's 5 St. The KRVR became the CP's Kettle Valley Railway. Although the former KRVR track north of this crossing no longer exists, it continues southwest almost to the south end of today's Cooper Rd.  

The Pacific Abrasives & Supply yard is on the southeast corner of where the former KRVR crossed the former north–south Great Northern Railway (GN) spur that accessed north and northwest of Grand Forks. This abrasives company has been shipping processed slag from the former Granby smelter for use in sandblasting or coating roofing tiles. At this crossing, the GN track north, and the KVL track west, were lifted long ago. GN was consolidated into the Burlington Northern Railroad (BN) in 1970, which merged to become the Burlington Northern and Santa Fe Railway (BNSF) in 1996.

Since the Pacific Abrasives yard linked northeastward to the former CP track and southward to the wye connecting with the east-west BNSF track, this yard formed an interchange between the two systems, but each had running rights beyond this point. After CP withdrew tracks to immediately west of Castlegar in 1992, the company kept a switcher at Grand Forks and train crews travelled from Nelson to move cars to/from/over the BN. At the time, Pope & Talbot (sawmill), Canpar Industries (particle board), and several smaller customers used the service. However, CP found this arrangement uneconomical.

GFR operation
In 1993, primarily under the oversight of Pope & Talbot, GFR was formed to operate a short section of former CP line and the connecting sidings. In 2004, Kettle Falls International Railway (KFR) replaced BNSF at the interchange. In 2008, Interfor Corporation bought the Pope & Talbot operations in Canada.

GFR, totalling  of track, may be the shortest shortline in Canada and possibly North America. The lone EMD SW8 locomotive GFR 6703, which was acquired from CP in 1993, was replaced in 2019 by a GATX Rail Locomotive Group SW1000 (GMTX 86).

In 2020, KFR parent, OmniTRAX, announced the planned closure of the Grand Forks–Laurier section of the KFR line within three years. A similar proposal in 2008 did not eventuate. Since GFR is disinterested in assuming this operation, a closure would also shut down the GFR.

See also

Footnotes

References

British Columbia railways
Railway companies established in 1992
1992 establishments in British Columbia